Sima Wang (205–271), courtesy name Zichu, was an imperial prince and military general of the Jin dynasty of China. He previously served in the state of Cao Wei during the Three Kingdoms period.

Life
Sima Wang was the second son of Sima Fu but he was adopted by his eldest uncle Sima Lang, who had no son to succeed him; Sima Wang was therefore officially Sima Lang's heir. He started his official career in the state of Cao Wei during the Three Kingdoms period and served in various positions, including Administrator of Pingyang Commandery and Agriculture General of the Household of Luoyang. In 251, he accompanied his uncle Sima Yi on a campaign against Wang Ling, who started a rebellion. After the rebellion was suppressed, the Wei government enfeoffed him as the Marquis of Yong'an Village to honour him for his contributions. Later, Sima Wang was promoted to a district marquis under the title "Marquis of Anle District" and given greater responsibilities as General Who Protects the Army and Regular Mounted Attendant.

The Wei emperor Cao Mao ( 254–260) was particularly fond of the literati, so he became close to notable members of the literati such as Sima Wang, Pei Xiu, Wang Chen and Zhong Hui. Cao Mao was known for being impatient and he wanted them to come for the banquets he hosted in the shortest time possible. Since Pei Xiu, Wang Chen, Zhong Hui and the others served as officials in the imperial palace, they were able to make it on time. Sima Wang, however, took more time to reach the imperial palace because he was stationed in a military camp. Cao Mao then gave him a fast-moving chariot so that he could travel faster, and also provided him five imperial guards as escorts.

At the time, Cao Mao was merely a puppet emperor as actual power was in the hands of the regent Sima Zhao (Sima Wang's cousin). Although Sima Wang was close to Cao Mao, he often felt uneasy in the emperor's presence so he requested to be assigned to positions far away from Luoyang, the imperial capital. Cao Mao then appointed him as General Who Attacks the West and granted him imperial authority to oversee military affairs in Yong and Liang provinces on Wei's western border. Before Sima Wang arrived in Yong and Liang provinces, the region was constantly under attack by Wei's rival state, Shu, as the Shu general Jiang Wei launched a series of invasions. After Sima Wang showed up, he strengthened the defences in the region and implemented new defensive strategies which successfully kept the enemy at bay and prevented them from gaining ground. After spending about eight years on the western border, Sima Wang was summoned back to Luoyang to serve as General of the Guards and later as General of Agile Cavalry. Shortly after, he replaced He Zeng as Minister over the Masses.

In 265, following Sima Zhao's death, his son Sima Yan (Emperor Wu) usurped the throne from the last Wei emperor Cao Huan and established the Jin dynasty (266–420) with himself as the emperor. After his accession, Emperor Wu enfeoffed Sima Wang as the Prince of Yiyang, with a princedom comprising 10,000 taxable households, as well as 2,000 troops under his command. In 267, Emperor Wu appointed Sima Wang as Grand Commandant.

In the late 260s, Shi Ji, a general from the Jin dynasty's rival state Eastern Wu, led troops to invade Jiangxia Commandery. Sima Wang led 20,000 troops to garrison at Longbei and strengthen the defences around Jiangxia Commandery. Emperor Wu also granted him imperial authority and appointed him as Grand Chief Controller to supervise military affairs in the region. He returned to Luoyang after the Wu invaders were driven back by Hu Lie, the Inspector of Jing Province. Sometime in the late 260s, the Wu general Ding Feng led his troops to attack the Jin position at Quebei. When Sima Wang heard about it, he led Jin forces to repel the invasion but Ding Feng had already retreated on his own by the time Sima Wang reached Quebei. Emperor Wu further promoted Sima Wang to Grand Marshal.

In 271, the Wu emperor Sun Hao personally led an invasion force to attack Shouchun (壽春; present-day Shou County, Anhui). Sima Wang then led 20,000 infantry and 3,000 cavalry to the Huai River region to strengthen the defences in the region. Sun Hao eventually withdrew his forces and returned to Wu. Sima Wang died later that year at the age of 67 (by East Asian age reckoning). Emperor Wu honoured him with the posthumous title "Prince Cheng", hence Sima Wang was formally referred to as "Prince Cheng of Yiyang". As Sima Wang was miserly and stingy while he was still alive, his family owned much wealth and property at the time of his death. Others scorned him for such behaviour.

See also
 Lists of people of the Three Kingdoms

References

 Chen, Shou (3rd century). Records of the Three Kingdoms (Sanguozhi).
 Fang, Xuanling (ed.) (648). Book of Jin (Jin Shu).
 Pei, Songzhi (5th century). Annotations to Records of the Three Kingdoms (Sanguozhi zhu).
 Sima, Guang (1084). Zizhi Tongjian.

205 births
271 deaths
Cao Wei politicians
Jin dynasty (266–420) imperial princes
Political office-holders in Shaanxi